is a 1998 Japanese pornographic splatter film written and directed by Tamakichi Anaru. The film is noted for its very extreme content, and is widely regarded as one of the most offensive and disgusting films ever to have been produced.

Plot
Shown almost entirely through a stationary camera, and a handheld one, the film has a woman named Kana and a man named Kiku being hired to star in an amateur porno, being made by two men. As the porn shoot progresses, it incorporates elements of BDSM such as: breast bondage, multiple penetration with dildoes, wax play, flagellation, and an enema. Uncomfortable with how rough the film has gotten, Kana tries to leave, prompting the director, cameraman and Kiku to knock her out, tie her to a bed, and strip her.

While Kiku rapes the semi-conscious Kana, the director cuts her left leg off with a meat cleaver, and mutilates her tongue with a knife, potato peeler, and shears to stop her screaming. When Kana passes out from the pain, she is injected with drugs to wake her up and keep her conscious. Kana's right arm and remaining leg are severed, and her abdomen is cut open so Kiku can have sex with her innards. After Kiku ejaculates blood-laden semen onto Kana's breasts, the director beats him over the head with the cleaver and stabs Kana in the face with it. Kiku is then castrated by the director, who makes a telephone call while the cameraman continues filming the mangled bodies of their two dead stars.

Cast 

Kanako Ooba as Kana
Kikurin as Kiku
Tamakichi Anaru as Snuff Video Director
Yuuji Kitano as Snuff Video Cameraman

Alternate titles 

 Judge for Yourself
 Niku Daruma
 Psycho
 Psycho: The Snuff Files
 Psycho: The Snuff Reels

Reception 

The film was regarded as being "as savage and brutal as they come" and further deemed "enough to make even the most hardcore horror/slasher fanatic go nauseous" by Prarthito Maity of the International Business Times.

References

External links 

 

1998 films
Necrophilia in film
Japanese splatter films
Films about rape
1998 horror films
Bondage pornography
Japanese pornographic films
Japanese horror films
Films about snuff films
Films about pornography
1990s Japanese-language films
1990s pornographic films
Obscenity controversies in film
Pornographic horror films
1998 direct-to-video films
Direct-to-video horror films
1990s Japanese films